Oliver Payne Pearson (October 21, 1915 in Philadelphia, Pennsylvania – March 4, 2003 in Walnut Creek, California), or "Paynie" to many that knew him, was an American zoologist and ecologist. Over a very active 50-year career, he served as professor of zoology at UC Berkeley and curator of mammals at the Museum of Vertebrate Zoology. Pearson is best known for his work on the role of predation on vole demography and population cycles, and for his piercing contributions to the biology of South American mammals, but his earlier studies on reproductive and physiological ecology are highly regarded as well.

Background
Pearson graduated from Swarthmore College in 1937. He attended Harvard University for both his M.S. (1939) and Ph.D. (1947), and was then hired by UC Berkeley as an instructor in zoology (1947–48). He was an assistant professor of zoology (Department of Zoology) and assistant curator of mammals (Museum of Vertebrate Zoology, MVZ) from 1949 to 1955, gaining tenure and advancing to associate professor of zoology and associate curator of mammals in the MVZ in 1955. In 1957 he resigned his tenured position, maintaining status at UC Berkeley as a lecturer in zoology and as a research associate at the museum. This allowed him to focus his attentions on his studies of voles and predation, and to spend a year as a visiting professor of ecology at the University of Buenos Aires (1964–65). When Alden Miller, director of the MVZ, died in 1965, Pearson returned to the tenure series, this time as full professor of zoology (which he retained until his real and very active retirement in 1971), and as acting director of the MVZ (1966–67) and then director (1967–71).

South America
In 1937 he traveled to Panama, then to Peru (1938, 1939–40, 1946, 1952, 1955, 1967, 1972), Colombia (1950) and Argentina (1955, 1964–65, and yearly from 1978 to 1999). He was honorary member of the American Society of Mammalogists (ASM), Cooper Ornithological Society (COS), Sociedad Argentina para el Estudio de los Mamíferos (SAREM) and the Comité Argentino de Conservación de la Naturaleza. He was an elected director for the ASM over 17 years between 1952 and 1990 and received the Hartley H. T. Jackson Award "for long and outstanding service to ASM" in 1984. After his death in 2003, the ASM established the Oliver Pearson Award, which offers financial support to young professional mammalogists who hold academic or curatorial positions in Latin America, to help them establish or consolidate their research programs.

Marriage
In 1944 he married Anita Kelley, who was to be his companion in all his subsequent travels, with whom he had four children. When awarded an honorary doctoral degree ("Doctor Honoris Causa") from the University of La Plata, Argentina in 2000, Pearson famously stated "Yo soy un simple atrapador de ratones, y nada hubiese sido posible sin Anita" ("I am a simple mouse-trapper, and nothing would have been possible without Anita").

Recognitions
Three rodent taxa were named after him: the species Ctenomys pearsoni (Lessa & Langguth, 1983) and Andalgalomys pearsoni (Myers, 1977), in addition to the genus Pearsonomys Patterson, 1992.

Selected publications

References

External links
 In memorian
 Memorial
 Obituary
 Museum of Vertebrate Zoology, University of California at Berkeley
 Latin American Fellowship Committee, American Society of Mammalogists

1915 births
2003 deaths
American ecologists
American mammalogists
20th-century American zoologists
Harvard University alumni
University of California, Berkeley faculty
Scientists from Philadelphia